Vera Valeryevna Lapko (born 29 September 1998) is a Belarusian professional tennis player.

She has won six singles titles and seven doubles titles on the ITF Circuit. On 1 October 2018, she reached her best singles ranking of world No. 60. On 14 May 2018, she peaked at No. 83 in the doubles rankings.

Lapko reached the 2014 US Open and 2015 Wimbledon girls' doubles finals, both times partnering Tereza Mihalíková. She won the 2016 Australian Open girls' singles title, defeating Mihalíková in the final.

Playing for Belarus Fed Cup team, Lapko has a win–loss record of 6–2 (as of November 2022).

Performance timeline

Only main-draw results in WTA Tour, Grand Slam tournaments, Fed Cup/Billie Jean King Cup and Olympic Games are included in win–loss records.

Singles
Current through the 2021 Astana Open.

WTA career finals

Doubles: 4 (4 runner-ups)

ITF Circuit finals

Singles: 12 (7 titles, 5 runner–ups)

Doubles: 14 (7 titles, 7 runner–ups)

Junior Grand Slam tournament finals

Girls' singles: 1 title

Girls' doubles: 2 runner–ups

Notes

References

External links

 
 
 

1998 births
Living people
Tennis players from Minsk
Belarusian female tennis players
Australian Open (tennis) junior champions
Grand Slam (tennis) champions in girls' singles
21st-century Belarusian women